Placolecis is a genus of lichen-forming fungi in the family Catillariaceae. It has four species of saxicolous (rock-dwelling) and crustose lichens. The genus was circumscribed by Italian botanist Vittore Benedetto Antonio Trevisan de Saint-Léon in 1857. He did not assign a type species for the genus. Josef Hafellner designated a lectotype for Placolecis balanina in 1984, but subsequently, this taxon was folded into P. opaca.

Species
Placolecis kunmingensis  – China
Placolecis loekoesiana 
Placolecis opaca 
Placolecis sublaevis  – China

The taxon once known as Placolecis plumbea  is now considered synonymous with Pectenia plumbea.

References

Lecanorales
Lecanorales genera
Lichen genera
Taxa described in 1857
Taxa named by Vittore Benedetto Antonio Trevisan de Saint-Léon